Abhay Chudasama  is an officer in the Indian Police Service.He born in ratanpur(GA) village, vallabhipur tehsil in Bhavnagar district. He graduated with the 1999 cadre.

The CBI arrested Chudasama in April 2010 for involvement in the death of Sohrabuddin Sheikh. CBI charged him for various activities, including collaborating with Sohrabuddin in operating a protection racket. 

In August 2014 the Gujarat Police reinstated Chudasama as an officer. In April 2015 the court discharged Chudasama saying that there was no evidence against him.

In June 2015 the Gujarat government promoted Chudasama to the rank of Deputy inspector general of police.

In 2018 the brother of the deceased Sohrabuddin made a that CBI made a mistake in reporting is testimony, and that he had never accused Chudasama.

In 2020 Chudasama transferred posts from Vadodara to Gandhinagar, leaving his former post to fellow officer H.G. Patel.

References

Indian police officers
Year of birth missing (living people)
Living people